The Passaic, Rutherford and Carlstadt Electric Railway was a trolley line incorporated in 1889 and consolidated into the Paterson, Passaic and Rutherford Electric Railway in 1893.

It served the Rutherford station on the Erie Railroad-controlled Paterson and Hudson River Railroad (today's Bergen County Line and the Carlstadt station on the Erie-controlled Hackensack and New York Railroad (today's Pascack Valley Line, although the station has been removed), using Paterson Plank Road for most of its length.
 
List of New Jersey street railroads

References

Light rail in New Jersey
Defunct New Jersey railroads
New Jersey streetcar lines
Defunct public transport operators in the United States
Tram, urban railway and trolley companies
Railway companies established in 1889
1889 establishments in New Jersey
Rutherford, New Jersey